José de Côrtes Duarte was a Brazilian writer born in Garanhuns, Pernambuco in the year 1895. His books are mainly narratives about regional aspects of Minas Gerais, where he lived as farmer and vaquero. His books became a source of information about historic aspects of the region. He was elected a lifetime member of the Academia Mineira de Letras (Academy of Letters of Minas Gerais).

Books 
 Vultos sem História - 1972
 A Tragédia de Sergipe e Outras Narrativas - Editorial Lemi, 1979
 O Fogo e o Boi - 1976
 Crônicas Quadradas - 1981

References

External links 
 Vultos sem história: narratives, por J. Duarte
 A tragédia de Sergipe e outras narrativas
 

1895 births
1982 deaths
Brazilian male writers
Portuguese-language writers
Brazilian people of Portuguese descent
People from Garanhuns